Garry Thompson may refer to:

 Garry Thompson (darts player) (born 1965), English darts player
 Garry Thompson (footballer, born 1959), English footballer and manager
 Garry Thompson (footballer, born 1980), English footballer

See also
 Gary Thompson (disambiguation)
 Garry Thomson (1925–2007), conservator and a Buddhist
 Gary Thomson, rugby league player